Jackson Beauregard Davis Sr. (March 27, 1918 – August 22, 2016) was an American lawyer and politician based in Shreveport, Louisiana, who served as a Democrat in the Louisiana State Senate from 1956 to 1980.

References

 

1918 births
2016 deaths
People from Rapides Parish, Louisiana
Politicians from Shreveport, Louisiana
Louisiana lawyers
Democratic Party Louisiana state senators
United States Navy personnel of World War II
United States Navy officers
Louisiana Christian University alumni
Northwestern State University alumni
Louisiana State University Law Center alumni
Baptists from Louisiana
Writers from Louisiana
20th-century American lawyers
20th-century Baptists